"Demon Speeding" is the second official single from Rob Zombie's second album The Sinister Urge and can also be found on his compilation album Past, Present & Future.

Chris Vrenna, formerly of the band Nine Inch Nails, remixed the song in 2002. This version of the song is entitled "Demon Speeding (Black River Mix)" and can be found on the NASCAR sponsored compilation album entitled Crank It Up and also in the video game FlatOut 2 along with Feel So Numb. The audio sample heard at the beginning of the song, "Why don't you ask me what it feels like to be a freak?", is from the film The Amazing Colossal Man. It has also featured on the Kerrang! Vol. 3 album, however, it was incorrectly named as "Dead Girl Superstar."

Track listing
7" single

Promo single

Personnel
 Rob Zombie – Vocals, Lyricist, Producer, Art Direction
 Tom Baker – Mastering
 Scott Humphrey – Producer, Programming, Mixing
 Blasko – Bass
 Riggs – Guitar
 Tempesta – Drums

Chart performance

References

Rob Zombie songs
2002 singles
Songs written by Rob Zombie
Songs written by Scott Humphrey
2001 songs
Geffen Records singles